"Fourteen Carat Mind" is a song written by Dallas Frazier and Larry Lee, and recorded by American country music artist Gene Watson. It was released in September 1981 as the first single from the album Old Loves Never Die. The song was Watson's twentieth country hit and his only song to hit No. 1 on the Billboard Hot Country Singles chart. The single stayed at No. 1 for one week and spent a total of fifteen weeks on that chart.

Charts

Covers
The Osborne Brothers covered the song on their 1991 album Hillbilly Fever.
Daniel Donato has covered the song on his 2021 album "Cosmic Country & Western Songs"

References

1981 singles
1981 songs
Gene Watson songs
Osborne Brothers songs
Songs written by Dallas Frazier
MCA Records singles
Songs written by Larry Lee